Edward Sharpe and the Magnetic Zeros is an American folk rock band formed in Los Angeles, California, in 2005. The group is led by singer Alex Ebert. The band's name is based on a story Ebert wrote in his youth, about a messianic figure named Edward Sharpe.  Drawing from roots rock, folk, gospel, and psychedelic music, the band's image and sound evoke the hippie movement of the 1960s and 1970s. The group's first show was played July 18, 2007, at The Troubadour in West Hollywood, California. Their first studio album, Up from Below, was released on July 7, 2009, on Community Records and featured the popular single "Home". The group released their second full-length album, Here, on May 29, 2012, and third album, Edward Sharpe and the Magnetic Zeros, on July 23, 2013. Their fourth studio album, PersonA, was released in April 2016.

Since its founding, the band has undergone several alterations. Most notably, singer Jade Castrinos left the band in 2014. The band's current members are Nicolo Aglietti, Mark Noseworthy, Orpheo McCord, Josh Collazo, Christian Letts, Seth Ford-Young, Mitchell Yoshida, Crash Richard, Stewart Cole, and Alex Ebert. The band also operates Big Sun, a non-profit focused on funding and developing co-ops and land trusts in urban areas around the world. Big Sun donated $100,000 to, "Avalon Village," in Highland Park, Michigan in 2016.

History

Origin and first studio album (Up from Below) 

After years of the Los Angeles party life and subsequent drug addiction, Ima Robot frontman Alex Ebert broke up with his girlfriend, moved out of his house, and spent time in rehabilitation. During this time, Ebert began to write a book about a messianic figure named Edward Sharpe who was "sent down to Earth to kinda heal and save mankind, but he kept getting distracted by girls and falling in love." Ebert adopted the Sharpe persona as his alter ego. He said, "I don't want to put too much weight on it, because in some ways it's just a name that I came up with. But I guess if I look deeper, I do feel like I had lost my identity in general. I really didn't know what was going on or who I was anymore. Adopting another name helped me open up an avenue to get back."

Ebert began initial writing and recording completely alone, doing "the horn lines with [his] mouth or a kazoo on the demos" and "all the background vocals layering ... pretending that there were people there." After meeting singer Jade Castrinos outside a Los Angeles cafe, Ebert and Castrinos started writing music together, and became a part of the art and music collective The Masses, which was partially started by some seed money from actor Heath Ledger. Their fledgling group eventually swelled to more than ten members, some of whom had been Alex's friends since he was young. In mid-2009, Ebert, Castrinos, and a group of musicians toured the country by bus as Edward Sharpe & the Magnetic Zeros. The first show they played in 2009 was at the Marfa Film Festival in Marfa, Texas. The band recorded their debut album, Up from Below, in Laurel Canyon. Produced by Nicolo Aglietti and Aaron Older, it was released on July 14, 2009. Up from Below is also the name of one of the songs in this album, in which Alex states "I was only five/when my dad told me I'd die/I cried as he said son/ was nothing could be done". Says Alexander, "My dad would be doing therapy in his office upstairs and I'd hear screamings, because they'd be role-playing and he'd be acting as his patient's father and they'd get upset and hit him and all this stuff. When he wasn't working, I'd go up there to draw and one day the music he was playing, Beethoven I think, delivered to me the idea of life and death. The information was bequeathed to me by the music. It was sonic and emotional. I tapped my dad on the shoulder and asked him if I was going to die and he said, 'Yeah.'" 

On April 12, 2009, the band released "Desert Song", a music video and the first of a 12-part feature-length musical called SALVO!. Part 2, "Kisses Over Babylon", was released November 24, 2009 through Spinner.com. Part 3, "40 Day Dream", was uploaded to YouTube by the band on May 19, 2011.

Big Easy Express and second studio album (Here) 
In April 2011, the band joined Mumford & Sons and Old Crow Medicine Show on the Railroad Revival Tour. According to American Songwriter, the tour stopped in six cities, playing alternative venues such as an Austin, Texas high school where Mumford & Sons taught the marching band how to play their hit "The Cave". The tour was also the subject of Grammy-nominated director Emmett Malloy's latest documentary Big Easy Express, which strove to capture "the pure joy of music" through Americana folk imagery. The documentary went on to win in the category for Best Long Form Music Video at the 2013 Grammy Awards. In 2011, Railroad Revival Tour bands Mumford & Sons, Edward Sharpe and the Magnetic Zeros, and Old Crow Medicine Show together closed their shows at every stop with "This Train".

The group's second album, Here, was released on May 29, 2012.

Third studio album (Edward Sharpe & The Magnetic Zeros)
The band's self-titled third studio album, Edward Sharpe and the Magnetic Zeros, was released in 2013. This was followed by tours of North America, UK, Europe, and Australia which included headlining concert dates as well as major festivals. The band became known for taking people onstage with them, including a former patient they had previously met in a hospital performance, and a disabled man in a wheelchair.

Fourth studio album (PersonA) 
The band's fourth studio album, PersonA, was released April 15, 2016 through Community Music. Recording the music almost entirely in one room together in New Orleans, their approach was a far cry from their ramshackle, come-one-come-all production audible on recordings of their previous albums.

In an in-depth interview with Transverso Media, Ebert explained his desire to evolve on PersonA, stating, "In a lot of ways this album does things that are missing." He went on to discuss why the name Edward Sharpe is crossed out on the cover, saying, "There was no character to begin with, so why not kill him? He never really was there. If anything, and at most, Edward Sharpe was a vehicle for me to get to slough off whatever I had become up until that point, and to get back to or sort of allow my pure self to come forth into sort of a clean slate."

Members

 Alex Ebert – vocals, guitar, percussion, piano
Nicolo Aglietti – guitar and co-producer; synthesizer, keyboards, vocals
 Stewart Cole – trumpet, percussion, keyboards, tenor ukulele, vocals
 Josh Collazo – drums, percussion, saxophone, vocals
 Orpheo McCord – drums, percussion, marimba, didgeridoo, vocals
 Christian Letts – guitar, vocals, mandolin
 Seth Ford-Young – bass, vocals
 Mark Noseworthy – guitar, vocals, banjo, mandolin, charango, ronroco
 Crash Richard – vocals, percussion
As of marketing on the band's Facebook page in 2013:
 Mitchell Yoshida – piano, clavinet, vocals

Additional, touring and/or recording personnel
As listed in the iTunes LP for the most recent album, Edward Sharpe and the Magnetic Zeros, 2013, or present tour:
 Aaron Arntz – piano; previously also clavinet, vocals as a main band member
 Aaron Embry – piano, organs; previously keyboards, piano, vocals, harmonica as a main band member
 Roger Joseph Manning Jr – piano
 Nathaniel Markman – fiddler
 Fred Bows – violin
 Susie Bows – violin
 Hippos August – humming, moaning, Surbahar

Former personnel
In addition to Arntz and Embry:
 Aaron Older – co-producer, bass, vocals, banjo, percussion
 Tay Strathairn – piano, harmonica, vocals
 Jade Castrinos – vocals, guitar, percussion, keyboard
 Nora Kirkpatrick – accordion, keyboard, vocals

Past touring/ additional personnel
 Odessa Jorgensen – fiddle, vocals during 2012-2013 tour
 Anna Bulbrook – viola, vocals
 Tyler James – piano, vocals
 Felix Bloxsom – drums
 Adam Privitera – penny whistler
 Ryan Richter – guitar, lap steel

Discography

Studio albums

EPs
 Here Comes EP (2009)

Singles

Notes

Other charted songs

References

External links
 

2005 establishments in California
American country rock groups
American indie folk groups
Dew Process artists
Folk rock groups from California
Grammy Award winners
Musical groups established in 2005
Musical groups from Los Angeles
Rough Trade Records artists
Vagrant Records artists